Daozang, meaning 'Taoist Canon', consists of around 1,400 texts that were collected  (after the Daodejing and Zhuangzi and Liezi which are the core Taoist texts).  They were collected by Taoist monks of the period in an attempt to bring together all of the teachings of Taoism, including all the commentaries and expositions of the various masters from the original teachings found in the Daodejing and Zhuangzi. These three divisions were based on the main focus of Taoism in Southern China during the time it was made, namely; meditation, ritual, and exorcism.

These Three Grottoes were used as levels for the initiation of Taoist masters, from lowest (exorcism) to highest (meditation).

As well as the Three Grottoes there were Four Supplements that were added to the canon c. 500.  These were mainly taken from older core Taoist texts (e.g. Daodejing) apart from one which was taken from an already established and separate philosophy known as Tianshi Dao (Way of the Heavenly Masters).

Although the above can give the appearance that the canon is highly organized, this is far from the truth.  Although the present-day canon does preserve the core divisions, there are substantial forks in the arrangement due to the later addition of commentaries, revelations and texts elaborating upon the core divisions.

Timeline 
The First Daozang
During the era of Northern and Southern dynasties, this was the first time of an effort was made to compile and categorised scriptures and texts from across China by Lu Xiujing and occurred around 471 and consisted of roughly 1,228 scrolls.
The Second Daozang
In 748, the Tang emperor Tang Xuan-Zong who was a devoted Taoist (the royal family claimed to be the descendants of Laozi) sent clergy to collect more scriptures and texts that expanded the Taoist Canon.
The Third Daozang
Around 1016 of the Song dynasty, the Daozang was revised and many texts collected during the Tang dynasty were removed. This third Daozang consisted of approximately more than 4500 scrolls and was known as Yunji Qiqian.
The Fourth Daozang
In 1444 of the Ming dynasty, a final version was produced consisting of approximately 5300 scrolls.
Many new Daozang were published.

Constituent parts

Three Grottoes  400 
Authenticity Grotto (Dongzhen) : Texts of Supreme Purity (Shangqing) tradition
This grotto is concerned mainly with meditation and is the highest phase of initiation for a Taoist master.
Mystery Grotto (Dongxuan) : Texts of Sacred Treasure (Lingbao) tradition
This grotto is concerned mainly with rituals and is the middle phase of initiation for a Taoist master.
Spirit Grotto (Dongshen) : Texts of Three Sovereigns (Sanhuang) tradition
This grotto is concerned mainly with exorcisms and is the lowest phase of initiation for a Taoist master.

Each of the Three Grottoes contains the following 12 chapters 
Main texts (Benwen) 
Talismans (Shenfu) 
Commentaries (Yujue) 
Diagrams and illustrations (Lingtu) 
Histories and genealogies (Pulu) 
Precepts (Jielu) 
Ceremonies (Weiyi) 
Rituals (Fangfa) 
Practices (Zhongshu) 
Biographies (Jizhuan) 
Hymns (Zansong) 
Memorials (Biaozou)

Four Supplements 500 
Great Mystery (Taixuan) : Based on the Dao De Jing
Great Peace (Taiping) : Based on the Taiping Jing
Great Purity (Taiqing) : Based on the Taiqing Jing and other alchemical texts
Orthodox One (Zhengyi) : Based on the Way of the Celestial Masters (Tianshi Dao) tradition.

External links

 Daozang (Taoist Canon) and Subsidiary Compilations (Judith M. Boltz), sample entry from The Encyclopledia of Taoism
 The Taoist Canon - maintained by David K. Jordan at UCSD. See also his overview of the canons of all three major Chinese religions, Buddhism, Confucianism and Taoism, here.
 Daoist Studies Daozang project - maintained by James Miller at Queen's University
  Tao Store Index - Online Taoist Scriptures in English
 Daozang - maintained by Raymond Larose at Jade Purity
 Daozang Jiyao Project
 Daozang Jiyao Catalogue (PDF) - Includes references to works also found or not found in the Daozang
 
 Digital Resources of Traditional Chinese Taoism (Daoism) Culture for Free Download
 

Series of books